is a Japanese screenwriter and novelist.

Career
Born in Asakusa, Tokyo, Yamada attended Waseda University before entering the Shōchiku film studios, where he trained as an assistant director under Keisuke Kinoshita. He left the company at age 30 to focus on writing scripts for television dramas, penning such successful series as Kishibe no arubamu and Fuzoroi no ringotachi. He has also written scripts for film and the stage.

As a novelist, his novel , published in 1987, won the Yamamoto Shūgorō Prize. It was translated into English, in 2004, as Strangers. Another Yamada novel, In Search of a Distant Voice, was translated and published in 2006  from a novel originally published in Japan in 1989. A third Yamada novel, was translated into English and published in 2008.

Selected works

Television
 Kishibe no arubamu (1977)
 Omoide zukuri (1981)
 Fuzoroi no ringotachi (1983)
 Fuzoroi no ringotachi II (1985)
 Fuzoroi no ringotachi III (1991)
 Fuzoroi no ringotachi IV (1997)

Film
 Final Take (キネマの天地 Kinema no Tenchi) (1986)
 Childhood Days (少年時代 Shōnen jidai) (1990)

Literature
  (1985)
  (1987)
  (1989)

References

External links
Yamada's site 
Taichi Yamada at J'Lit Books from Japan 

1934 births
Living people
Japanese screenwriters
20th-century Japanese novelists
21st-century Japanese novelists
People from Tokyo
Waseda University alumni
Japanese television writers
Yugawara, Kanagawa